Józef Łuszczek (born 20 May 1955 in Ząb) is a Polish former cross-country skier who competed from 1978 to 1984. He won two medals at the 1978 FIS Nordic World Ski Championships in Lahti with a gold in the 15 km and a bronze in the 30 km.

Łuszczek's best Winter Olympic finish was 5th in the 30 km event at Lake Placid, New York in 1980.

References

External links
 

1955 births
Cross-country skiers at the 1980 Winter Olympics
Cross-country skiers at the 1984 Winter Olympics
Polish male cross-country skiers
Olympic cross-country skiers of Poland
Living people
FIS Nordic World Ski Championships medalists in cross-country skiing
People from Tatra County
Sportspeople from Lesser Poland Voivodeship